Barangerd (also Romanized as Bārāngerd) is a village in Qaleh Tall Rural District, in the Central District of Bagh-e Malek County, Khuzestan Province, Iran. At the 2006 census, its population was 1,474, in 316 families.

References 

Populated places in Bagh-e Malek County